Half Dome Granodiorite is granodiorite (see also granite) found in a region on and near Half Dome, in Yosemite National Park, California, United States. The granodiorite forms part of the Tuolumne Intrusive Suite (aka Tuolumne Batholith), one of the four major intrusive suites within the Sierra Nevada.

Mineralogy
The granodiorite has large crystals of biotite, hornblende, and both feldspars — orthoclase and plagioclase. The space between crystals tends to be filled with quartz. The hornblende tends to have large, over  rectangular crystals. A knife blade can peel the edges.

Sphene is found in Half Dome Granodiorite. Uranium is also present.

From petrographic observation, the average mineral proportion of non-layered rocks of Half Dome Granodiorite is 45% plagioclase feldspar, 25% quartz, 8% biotite, 15% K-feldspar, 5% hornblende, 1% titanite, and 1% magnetite.

Age
Half Dome Granodiorite traces to early Late Cretaceous. Its age is between 85 and 83.4 (+/-1 to 2%) Ma, with average age of 84.1 Ma. It is younger than Sentinel granodiorite (88.4 Ma), and older than Cathedral Peak granite (83.7 Ma). Half Dome Granodiorite is the Valley's youngest plutonic rock.

Locations
Half Dome Granodiorite dominates Yosemite Valley area east of Royal Arches and Glacier Point. At Church Bowl and in the cliff west of Royal Arches, horizontal dikes of Half Dome Granodiorite cut the older granodiorite of Kuna Crest. Half Dome Granodiorite forms the sheer cliffs to the north of the trail between the Ahwahnee Hotel and Mirror Lake . The trail to Vernal and Nevada Falls also crosses through Half Dome Granodiorite.

See also

 Cathedral Peak Granodiorite
 El Capitan Granite
 Geology of the Yosemite area
 Kuna Crest Granodiorite
 Sentinel granodiorite
 Tuolumne Intrusive Suite

References

Geology of California
Geology of Yosemite National Park
Cretaceous magmatism
Yosemite National Park